CALIPSO is a joint NASA (USA) and CNES (France) environmental satellite, built in the Cannes Mandelieu Space Center, which was launched atop a Delta II rocket on April 28, 2006.  Its name stands for Cloud-Aerosol Lidar and Infrared Pathfinder Satellite Observations. CALIPSO Launched Alongside CloudSat.

Passive and active remote sensing Instruments on board the CALIPSO satellite monitor aerosols and clouds 24 hours a day. CALIPSO is part of the "C-Train" alongside CloudSat, orbiting on a similar track to the "A-Train."

Mission
Three instruments:
 Cloud-Aerosol Lidar with Orthogonal Polarization (CALIOP) - a lidar that provides high-resolution vertical profiles of aerosols and clouds.
 Wide Field Camera (WFC) - a modified version of the commercial off-the-shelf Ball Aerospace CT-633 star tracker camera. It was selected to match band 1 of the MODIS instrument on the Aqua satellite.
 Imaging Infrared Radiometer (IIR) - used to detect cirrus cloud emissivity and particle size. The CALIOP laser beam is aligned with the center of the IIR image to optimize joint CALIOP/IIR observations.

In February 2009, CALIPSO switched over to the redundant laser as scheduled. The primary laser achieved its mission goal of three years of successful operation, and the redundant laser has been performing beyond expectations.

The CALIPSO mission was granted extended mission status in June 2009.

See also

A-train (satellite constellation)
Earth Observing System
List of spaceflights (2006)

References

External links

CALIPSO Outreach
CALIPSO and the A Train
The CALIPSO page at NASA
The CALIPSO page at French National Centre for Space Studies (CNES)
CALIPSO Mission Profile by NASA's Solar System Exploration
CALIPSO results in five to ten years
CALIPSO specs at NASA

Earth observation satellites of the United States
Environmental science
Satellites orbiting Earth
Satellite meteorology
Satellites of France
Spacecraft launched by Delta II rockets
Spacecraft launched in 2006
NASA satellites
2006 in France